Ledger Wood (September 4, 1901 – December 7, 1970) was a twentieth-century American philosopher.

Life and career
Wood received his doctorate from Cornell University in 1926 and was appointed assistant professor of philosophy at Princeton University in 1927. He remained a member of the Princeton Philosophy Department for 43 years, serving as departmental chair from 1952 to 1960.  After his retirement in 1970, he was appointed McCosh Professor of Philosophy Emeritus.

Major works

Books

Notes

1901 births
1970 deaths
20th-century American philosophers
American historians of philosophy
American philosophy academics
Epistemologists
People from Pueblo, Colorado
Princeton University faculty
Cornell University alumni
20th-century American historians
American male non-fiction writers
20th-century American male writers